The Bahuti Falls is a waterfall in Rewa district in the Indian state of Madhya Pradesh. It is the highest waterfall in Madhya Pradesh.

The Falls 
Bahuti is a waterfall in Madhya Pradesh. It is on the river Nihai (also called as Odda) as it rushes down the edge of the Valley of Mauganj to join the Belan River, which is a tributary of Tamas or Tons River. Some say it is on the river Sellar.

The Bahuti Falls is an example of a nick point caused by rejuvenation. Knick point, also called a nick point or simply nick, represents breaks in slopes in the longitudinal profile of a river caused by rejuvenation. The break in channel gradient allows water to fall vertically giving rise to a waterfall.

Flora and Fauna 
Rewa has a somewhat Table landform. Bahuti Prapat lies on its North-eastern edge. Fauna species of Hyena, Nilgai, Jackal, Bengal Monster Lizard, Indian Roller Bird, Indian Grey Hornbill, Oriental Magpie Robin etc can be seen here.

Rewa 
The region is elevated as compared to nearby districts. To reach Rewa, several ghats are to be encountered - Chhuhiya Ghat (South-east), Dramondganj Ghat (North-east), Sohagi-Chak Ghat (North) and Semariya Ghat (West) and Patpara Ghat (East). The terrain is rocky, with large proportions of Red and Laterite Soil (Murum).

References

Waterfalls of Madhya Pradesh
Tourist attractions in Rewa district